Suggestion Box is a short propaganda film produced in 1943 by the Office of War Information. Its purpose was to encourage workers to send in suggestions for more effective war production.

The film opens with a standard factory suggestion box and the many workers who slip pieces of paper in it as they walk by. The suggestions are then gathered and sent to Washington DC where a board of experts examines each one to find its merits for more efficient and speedy war production. A few examples are given:
a worker who was working on iron tubes finds a way to increase his production by lining them up all together
a black janitor suggests a way to save oil from being spilled
and a woman uses her Grandmother's method of button making to make better rivets.

Some of these people whose ideas are taken up by the committee are given awards for helping war production.

The film's message to use suggestion boxes was also spread through propaganda posters at the time.

External links 
Complete film online at archive.org

1943 films
American World War II propaganda shorts
American black-and-white films
American short documentary films
1940s short documentary films
1940s American films